SouthWest station is a park and ride facility and a transit hub with two bus platforms for SouthWest Transit in Eden Prairie, Minnesota. The station is being reconfigured to include a light rail station on the Metro Southwest LRT, which is an extension of the Green Line. The station is located on Technology Drive in Eden Prairie, just north of the Purgatory Creek wetland area and south of U.S. Route 212. In December 2018 the Metropolitan Council purchased the station from SouthWest Transit for $8 million. The Metropolitan Council's 2021 park-and-ride system report found 156 cars parked at the station compared to 829 in 2019 before the COVID-19 pandemic.

Modeled after Burnsville Station, SouthWest station was one of several suburban park and ride facilities opened in the Twin Cities in the late 1990s. When it originally opened in 1998, it had 500 parking spaces and 15 acres of surrounding land available for housing and commercial development. The station cost $5 million which was twice the cost of Burnsville Station. Construction began on a 3 level parking ramp in November 2001 that could accommodate 700 vehicles. The new parking ramp cost $9.7 million and was designed to accommodate a 4th level with additional spaces. Land surrounding the station had begun to be sold for restaurants, apartments, and townhouses. By 2006 parking on the site had expanded to 900 spaces on 5 levels but was still often full. At the time, SouthWest Station had 230 units of housing.

References

External links
Southwest Station Engineering Design
Prairie Center Drive Engineering Design

Metro Green Line (Minnesota) stations
Railway stations scheduled to open in 2025
Transportation buildings and structures in Hennepin County, Minnesota
Railway stations under construction in the United States